The 2021–22 Georgia Southern Eagles women's basketball team represented Georgia Southern University during the 2021–22 NCAA Division I women's basketball season. The basketball team, led by third-year head coach Anita Howard, played all home games at the Hanner Fieldhouse along with the Georgia Southern Eagles men's basketball team. They were members of the Sun Belt Conference.

Roster

Schedule and results

|-
!colspan=9 style=| Exhibition
|-

|-
!colspan=9 style=| Non-conference Regular Season
|-

|-
!colspan=9 style=| Conference Regular Season
|-

|-
!colspan=9 style=| Sun Belt Tournament

See also
 2021–22 Georgia Southern Eagles men's basketball team

References

Georgia Southern Eagles women's basketball seasons
Georgia Southern Eagles
Georgia Southern Eagles women's basketball
Georgia Southern Eagles women's basketball